KV Sasja HC Hoboken is a Belgian handball team from Hoboken, Antwerp. They compete in Belgian liga 1 and the BeNe League.

Accomplishments

BeNe League: 
Winners (1) : 2008
Belgian First Division: 
Winners (6) : 1968, 1974, 1975, 2006, 2007, 2008
Belgian Cup: 
Winners (6) : 1971, 1973, 1977, 1981, 1982, 2007
Runner-Up (9) : 1967, 1975, 1980, 1984, 1987, 1988, 1995, 2011, 2017

Team

Current squad 

Squad for the 2016–17 season 

Goalkeepers
 Sam Theyssens

Wingers
RW
LW
Line 
  Nemanja Kostic

Back players
LB
CB 
  Kevin Jacobs
  Hans Lamberigts
  Jasper Roelants

References

External links

Belgian handball clubs
Sport in Antwerp